Bereg-Yurdya (Bierek Ürde) is a rural locality (a selo), and one of three settlements in First Borogonsky Rural Okrug of Oymyakonsky District in the Sakha Republic, Russia, in addition to Oymyakon, the administrative center of the Rural Okrug and Khara-Tumul. Its population as of the 2002 Census was 299.

References

Notes

Sources
Official website of the Sakha Republic. Registry of the Administrative-Territorial Divisions of the Sakha Republic. Oymyakonsky District. 

Rural localities in Oymyakonsky District